The 1987 Little League World Series took place between August 25 and August 29 in Williamsport, Pennsylvania. The Hualien Little League from Hualien, Taiwan, defeated the Northwood Little League of Irvine, California, in the championship game of the 41st Little League World Series. , the 21 runs scored by Taiwan, and their winning margin of 20 runs, are LLWS championship game records.

The Northwood team went on an 18-game winning streak to become the U.S. champions. They were the first team from Orange County, California, to play in the LLWS. In , Ocean View Little League of Huntington Beach, California, would become the first Orange County team to win the LLWS.

Teams

 Rolando Paulino, namesake of the team from the Dominican Republic, was later embroiled in scandal after the  event, when Danny Almonte, pitcher for The Bronx team, was found to be over the age limit.

Championship Bracket

The third-place game was cancelled due to inclement weather; Dominican Republic and Indiana shared third place.

Position Bracket

The last two games in the position bracket were cancelled due to inclement weather.

Notable players

References

External links

Northwood Little League

Little League World Series
Little League World Series
Little League World Series
Little League World Series